Typhoon Olive was the strongest Pacific typhoon in 1952. The next day, the system attained tropical storm intensity. Beginning to rapidly intensify, Olive attained typhoon intensity on September 15. Olive reached Category 5 intensity on the modern-day Saffir–Simpson hurricane wind scale on September 16.

Olive produced significant damage on Wake Island, where wind gusts reached . Significant flooding was reported, and the majority of the structures were destroyed. However, few injuries were reported, and the island's facilities were restored in 1953. Typhoon Olive remains one of the most intense tropical cyclones to affect the island.

Meteorological history

On September 8, an area of disturbed weather, located near 12.0°N 169.0°W, was plotted as a tropical wave on surface weather maps. Operationally, however, the system was not classified as a tropical storm until September 15; however, postseason analysis determined that the system acquired tropical storm intensity on 0000 UTC on September 15. Tropical Storm Olive, moving west-northwest near , turned toward Wake Island on September 15. Around this time, reconnaissance aircraft reported a minimum central pressure of 945 mbar (hPa; 27.91 inHg). On September 16, Olive intensified from a Category 2 to a Category 4 typhoon, attained the equivalence of super typhoon intensity, and strengthened to a peak intensity of  the following day far from land. On September 18, Olive weakened from a Category 5 to a Category 2 typhoon and recurved northeast. On September 19, the cyclone lost typhoon intensity. Tropical Storm Olive transitioned into an extratropical cyclone and was last monitored on September 21.

Preparations and impact
On Wake Island, 750 people sheltered in World War II bunkers. Significant flooding was also recorded. Damage was severe; it is estimated that 85% of the island's structures were demolished due to the storm. All of the homes and the island's hotel were destroyed. Additionally, the island's chapel and quonset huts were destroyed. The island's LORAN station, operated by the United States Coast Guard, was also destroyed. On September 18, water and power services were restored. The facilities on the island were fully restored in 1953. The total cost to repair damages caused by Olive amounted to $1.6 million (1952 USD; $13 million 2009 USD). No fatalities occurred on the island, and four injuries were reported. None of the 230 Pan American World Airways employees received injuries.

See also

Other tropical cyclones named Olive
Typhoon Hester  
Typhoon Sarah
Hurricane Ioke

References

External links
JMA General Information of Typhoon Olive (5213) from Digital Typhoon

1952 Pacific typhoon season
Typhoon Olive (1952)
Typhoons
September 1952 events in Oceania